KREP (92.1 FM) is a radio station licensed to serve the community of Belleville, Kansas. The station is owned by First Republic Broadcasting Corporation, and airs a country music format.

The station was assigned the KREP call letters by the Federal Communications Commission on December 27, 1983.

References

External links
 Official Website
 FCC Public Inspection File for KREP
 

REP
Radio stations established in 1984
1984 establishments in Kansas
Country radio stations in the United States
Republic County, Kansas